Nehzat-e Olya (also Romanized as Nehẕat-e ‘Olyā; also known as Nehẕat and Shāhrokhī) is a village in Vahdat Rural District, Mugarmun District, Landeh County, Kohgiluyeh and Boyer-Ahmad Province, Iran. At the 2006 census, its population was 52, in 10 families.

References 

Populated places in Landeh County